West Bangor is a hamlet in Franklin County, New York, United States.

References

 Hamlets in Franklin County, New York
 Hamlets in New York (state)